The Salmson 2 A.2, (often shortened to Salmson 2) was a French biplane reconnaissance aircraft developed and produced by Salmson to a 1916 requirement. Along with the Breguet 14, it was the main reconnaissance aircraft of the French army in 1918 and was also used by American Expeditionary Force aviation units. At the end of the First World War, one-third of French reconnaissance aircraft were Salmson 2s.

Design and development
During the First World War, the Salmson factory built aircraft engines, generally 9- and later 18-cylinder water-cooled radial engines developed from the Swiss Canton-Unné design, an early stationary radial engine design used for military aircraft. The company's first aircraft was the Salmson-Moineau S.M.1, an unusual three-seat reconnaissance biplane with twin propellers gear-driven from a single Salmson engine mounted sideways in the fuselage but it was not successful although it saw limited production.

The Salmson 2 came from a requirement to replace the Sopwith 1½ Strutter and Dorand A.R. reconnaissance aircraft in the A.2 (tactical reconnaissance) role. Salmson had built the 1½ Strutter under license, and the Salmson 2, while an original design, had more in common with the Sopwith than to the Salmson-Moineau. The aircraft was of conventional construction with a two-bay biplane configuration, powered by the company's own  Salmson 9Z water-cooled radial engine. Some minor control problems were quickly resolved in early testing, but the main defect of the Salmson 2, shared with the contemporary Airco DH.4, was that the pilot and gunner were widely separated, making communication difficult. Production was ordered after trials on 29 April 1917, and deliveries were underway by October of that year. Around 3,200 Salmson 2s were built in France, 2,200 by Salmson and the remainder by the Latécoère, Hanriot, and Desfontaines, companies. Some of these were Salmson 2 E.2 dual control advanced training (Ecole) aircraft.

Variants
Developments of the Salmson 2 included:
 Salmson 2 A.2 standard model.
 Salmson 2 E.2 dual control advanced training aircraft.
 Salmson 4 Ab.2 was an enlarged version fitted with armour to meet the ground attack role. Production in 1918 was limited, and was cancelled at the end of the war.
 Salmson 5 A.2 was a modified Salmson 2, with no production.
 Salmson 7 A.2 was a modified Salmson 2. The primary change was that the pilot and gunner were seated back-to-back in a single cockpit. Large scale production was planned, but was cancelled with the end of the war.
 Salmson Limousine ex-military Salmson 2s converted into enclosed civilian passenger aircraft after the First World War.
 Salmson 2 Berline ex-military Salmson 2s converted into open cockpit civilian passenger aircraft after the First World War.
 Kawasaki Army Otsu-1 (乙-1) Reconnaissance Aircraft was a Japanese licence-built Salmson 2 A.2.

Operational history
In addition to its service with the French army, the Salmson 2 served during the First World War with United States air units. Some 700 were purchased, and were generally successful.

Postwar Salmson 2s were purchased by Czechoslovakia, and remained in service until 1924. Others were transferred to Poland, but were withdrawn by 1920, and replaced by Bristol F.2Bs. Japan undertook licensed production as the Army Type Otsu 1, also known as the Kawasaki-Salmson. The number of aircraft built in Japan is unclear; 300 were built by Kawasaki, and the same quantity by the Imperial Japanese Army's Tokorozawa supply depot, although the total number of aircraft produced may have been as high as 1,000.

After First World War, the Salmson 2 A.2 produced by Latécoère were the first aircraft used by French pioneering airmail company Aéropostale.

Military operators

Wartime
 
 French Air Force
 
 American Expeditionary Force

Post-war

 
 Belgian Air Force - One aircraft only.
 
 Czechoslovak Air Force
 
 French Navy
 
 Imperial Japanese Army

 Peruvian Air Force - One aircraft only.
 
 Polish Air Force
 
 Spanish Air Force - One aircraft only.
  / 
 Soviet Air Force

Aircraft on display
 Kakamigahara Aerospace Museum, Kakamigahara, Gifu (replica)
 L'Envol des Pionniers, Toulouse, France (replica)

Specifications

References

Further reading

 

1910s French military reconnaissance aircraft
Biplanes
Salmson aircraft
Single-engined tractor aircraft
Aircraft first flown in 1917